Saat Phere is a 1970 black and white Indian Hindi-language film starring Meena Kumari, Pradeep Kumar and Shyama in lead roles. The film was directed by Sundar Dhar.

Cast
 Meena Kumari
 Pradeep Kumar
 Shyama 
 Mukri
 Anwar Hussain
 Roopesh Kumar

Crew
 Director – Sundar Dhar
 Music – Sudhir Sen
 Lyricist – Kaifi Azmi
 Playback Singers – Mohammed Rafi, Asha Bhosle, Usha Mangeshkar, Suman Kalyanpur

Soundtrack
The film had seven songs in it. The music of the film was composed by Sudhir Sen. Kaifi Azmi wrote the lyrics.

 "Gore Jism Aur Gulabi Gaal Wali" - Mohammed Rafi
 "Jo Honge Agar" - Mohammed Rafi
 "Aji Hum Hi To Hai" - Asha Bhosle, Usha Mangeshkar
 "Ghunghar Baje Saath" - Asha Bhosle
 "Saji Sej Se Utha Ke" - Suman Kalyanpur
 "Sata Ke Mujhko Dilruba" - Asha Bhosle
 "Tumse Dil Ki To Koi Baat" - Asha Bhosle

See also
 Saat phere

References

External links
 

1970 films
1970s Hindi-language films
Films about Indian weddings